The 7th millennium BC spanned the years 7000 BC to 6001 BC (c. 9 ka to c. 8 ka). It is impossible to precisely date events around this millennium, and all dates mentioned here are estimates mostly based on geological and anthropological analysis. 

Towards the end of this millennium, the islands of Great Britain, and Ireland were severed from continental Europe by rising seawater.

Communities

Population
Neolithic culture and technology were established in the Near East by 7000 BC and there is increasing evidence through the millennium of its spread or introduction to Europe and the Far East. In most of the world, however, including north and western Europe, people still lived in scattered Palaeolithic hunter-gatherer communities. The Mehrgarh chalcolithic civilization began around 7000 BC. The world population is believed to have been stable and slowly increasing. It has been estimated that there were perhaps ten million people worldwide at the end of this millennium, growing to forty million by 5000 BC and 100 million by 1600 BC, an average growth rate of 0.027% p.a. from the beginning of the Neolithic to the Middle Bronze Age.

Europe
Neolithic culture and technology reached modern Turkey and Greece c. 7000 BC; and Crete about the same time. The innovations, including the introduction of farming, spread from the Middle East through Turkey and Egypt. There is evidence of domesticated sheep or goats, pigs, and cattle, together with grains of cultivated bread wheat. The domestication of pigs in Eastern Europe is believed to have begun c. 6800 BC. The pigs may have descended from European wild boar or were probably introduced by farmers migrating from the Middle East. There is evidence, c. 6200 BC, of farmers from the Middle East reaching the Danube and moving into Romania and Serbia. Farming gradually spread westward and northward over the next four millennia, finally reaching Great Britain and Scandinavia c. 3000 BC to complete the transition of Europe from the Mesolithic to the Neolithic.

Near East
The Ubaid period (c. 6500–3800 BC) began in Mesopotamia, its name derived from Tell al-'Ubaid where the first significant excavation took place.

By the end of this millennium, Tell es-Sultan (Jericho) had become a large agricultural settlement with some eight to ten acres within its walls. Kathleen Kenyon reckoned that it was home to about three thousand people. Construction was done using stone implements to mould clay into bricks. The main crop was wheat.

The Steppe
“Sheep and goats were domesticated in South West Asia, probably in the region of eastern Anatolia and northern Syria between 8000 and 7500 BC, and were part of the agricultural package that was transmitted to Greece and the Balkans during the pioneering movements in the seventh millennium. From there the herding of domesticated sheep and goats was gradually taken up by foraging communities in the Pontic-Caspian steppe during the sixth and fifth millennia and became an essential part of the herder economy.”

Geologic and climatic change

The Northgrippian
In the geologic time scale, the "Northgrippian" succeeded the "Greenlandian" c. 6236 BC (to c. 2250 BC). The starting point for the Northgrippian is the so-called 8.2 kiloyear event, which was an abrupt climate change lasting some four centuries in which there was a marked decrease in global temperatures, possibly caused by an influx of glacial meltwater into the North Atlantic Ocean.

Creation of Great Britain and Ireland
The influx is believed to be one factor in the creation of Great Britain and Ireland as islands separate from the European continent. After the Last Ice Age ended c. 9700 BC, increasing sea levels gradually inundated Doggerland, a land bridge which linked Great Britain to Denmark and the Netherlands. This process began the formation of the North Sea and the English Channel. Further west, another low-lying land area was being flooded to form the Irish Sea and create Ireland. Sometime in the second half of the 7th millennium, the Storegga Slides occurred off Norway to generate a huge tsunami which completely overwhelmed Doggerland and its Mesolithic community of an estimated 5,000 hunter-gatherers. By about 6100 BC, Great Britain had become an island.

Astronomy
Jupiter occulted Saturn in 6857 B.C.E. This is one of the rarest astronomical events in the solar system, with the next occurrence on February 17, 7541.

References

Bibliography
 

 
-93